The 2010 Military Bowl presented by Northrop Grumman was the third edition of the college football bowl game previously called the EagleBank Bowl.  It was played as scheduled at RFK Stadium in Washington, D.C. on December 29, 2010, at 2:30 p.m. (ET), and telecast on ESPN.  The event remains sponsored by EagleBank and is organized by the DC Bowl Committee, Inc. and the Washington Convention and Sports Authority.

Teams 
The bowl organizers selected the Maryland Terrapins from the Atlantic Coast Conference and the East Carolina Pirates from Conference USA.   This is the first ever meeting between the two programs.

East Carolina Pirates

The bowl selected the 6-6 East Carolina Pirates to serve as the Conference USA representative.  Coming off the 2009 season in which they were the Conference USA Champions and its representative in the Liberty Bowl the Pirates struggled a bit in 2010, losing 4 of their last 5 games.   It was ECU's first appearance in the Military Bowl.  The appearance marks their unprecedented fifth straight bowl appearance, its seventh since 2000 and 17th overall in program history.

Maryland Terrapins

Coming off a disappointing 2–10 season in 2009 Maryland returns to a bowl game to face East Carolina.  Head coach Ralph Friedgen was named the ACC's Coach of the Year for the turnaround, which was the second-best in the FBS this year, and this game marked his final game as the head coach of Maryland. Quarterback Danny O’Brien was named the league's Rookie of the Year.  The Terps were one win away from playing in the ACC title game but settled for the ACC's 8th bowl tie-in selection.  Maryland has won four of its past five bowl games and has outscored its last four bowl opponents 151–73.  This is their first appearance in the Military Bowl.

Contingency for Army
Army had a contingency agreement with the game organizers that would have allowed the Black Knights to go to the game if either the ACC or Conference USA was unable to send a team to the bowl game.  However, this tie-in would only have become applicable if the Armed Forces Bowl failed to select Army first. This scenario was taken off the table on November 30, when the Armed Forces Bowl extended a bid to Army.

Game Summary

Scoring

Statistics

References

External links
 

Military Bowl
Military Bowl
East Carolina Pirates football bowl games
Maryland Terrapins football bowl games
Military Bowl
December 2010 sports events in the United States